This Peter Mark Memorial Award was established in 1979 by American Vacuum Society "
To recognize outstanding theoretical or experimental work by a young scientist or engineer."

See also

 List of physics awards

References

External links
 

Physics awards
Early career awards
Awards established in 1979
1979 establishments in the United States